Hidden Lakes is a census-designated place (CDP) in Morrow County, Ohio, United States. It was first listed as a CDP prior to the 2020 census.

The CDP is in central Morrow County, in the northwest part of Franklin Township. It is bordered to the north by Congress Township and very slightly by Gilead Township. It is a recreational community built around a small artificial lake and the headwaters of the Kokosing River, a southeast-flowing tributary of the Walhonding River and part of the Muskingum River watershed leading to the Ohio.

Demographics

References 

Census-designated places in Morrow County, Ohio
Census-designated places in Ohio